In the United Kingdom, the Judge Advocate General and Judge Martial of all the Forces is a judge responsible for the court-martial process within the Royal Navy, British Army and Royal Air Force. As such the post has existed since 2008; prior to this date the Judge Advocate General's authority related to the Army and the RAF while the Judge Advocate of the Fleet was the equivalent with regard to the Royal Navy.

Origins
A Judge Martial is recorded as serving under the Earl of Leicester in the Netherlands in 1587–88. There were judge advocates on both sides during the English Civil War and following the Restoration the office of Judge Advocate of the Army (soon to be known as Judge Advocate General) was established on a permanent basis in 1666. Since 1682 the Judge Advocate General has been appointed by letters patent of the sovereign; until 1892 most judge advocates were Members of Parliament, indeed from 1806 the office was a political one, the holder resigning on a change of government.

After 1892 the role of Judge Advocate General became a judicial rather than a ministerial office; at first it was combined with the President of the Probate Divorce and Admiralty Division before being made fully independent in 1905.

The Judge Advocate General has been entitled to appoint deputies since 1682.

Role
The Judge Advocate General is Head of the Service Justice System. The Judge Advocate General is the senior judge advocate and is the overall lead for the jurisdiction (i.e. is not under the authority of the Lord Chief Justice or any other presiding judge).

The Judge Advocate General is assisted by a team of judges who comprise the permanent judiciary, plus a small staff of civil servants. There is a total of seven judges, comprising one vice-judge advocate general, and six Assistant judge advocates general, all of whom must be barristers or advocates of seven years standing. Only judges appointed by the JAG may preside over proceedings in the Service courts, which comprise the Court Martial, the Summary Appeal Court, and the Service Civilian Court.  The judges control the practice and procedure, give rulings on legal matters, and sum up the evidence for the jury (known as a "board"). Defendants are entitled to a defending counsel or solicitor, and their unit may provide an accused's assisting officer if they so wish. The Judge Advocate General has higher authority over all units in the Armed Forces such as intelligence and combat units. The Judge Advocate General is equivalent to the position of Secretary of State for Defence.

The Judge Advocate General's office holds cases deposited the originals of all records of proceedings, which are kept for at least six years.

Historic role
Historically the Judge Advocate General had responsibility for prosecuting cases as well as for summoning and supervising the court. In 1923 moves were made to separate responsibility for prosecutions from the judicial responsibilities of the Judge Advocate General's office; complete separation was achieved 25 years later with the establishment of the Directorate of Army Legal Services in the War Office (and a parallel Directorate in the Air Ministry).

Changes in the 2000s
In the 1990s significant changes to the courts-martial system were instigated following European Court of Human Rights judgments. The Judge Advocate General was formerly the legal adviser of the armed forces, a role that ended in 2000. In both naval and military cases, all proceedings in the military courts of the United Kingdom are held under his or her authority (the former office of Judge Advocate of the Fleet having been amalgamated into that of the Judge Advocate General in 2008). Previously the Royal Navy, the British Army and the Royal Air Force had separate court martial arrangements, but all three Services have operated under a single system of service law since November 2009.

The former practice of reviewing the findings and sentences of all trials of the old courts-martial was abolished in October 2009.  Now the outcome of each trial in the court martial (now a standing court) is final, subject to appeal to the Court Martial Appeal Court.  The Judge Advocate General has the authority to be the trier of fact for all cases, set rules, standards, procedures, and regulations for the Military courts of the United Kingdom.

Qualifications
The post is regulated by the Courts-Martial (Appeals) Act 1951. The appointment is made by the British Sovereign on the recommendation of the Lord Chancellor. Formerly, the Judge Advocate General had to be a barrister, advocate, or solicitor with higher rights of audience, of ten years' standing. As of 21 July 2008 the experience needed to qualify was reduced in line with a general move to broaden diversity in the judiciary. An appointee who has practised in England and Wales now has to satisfy the judicial-appointment eligibility condition on a seven-year basis, while a practitioner from Scotland or Northern Ireland will need seven-years' standing as barrister, advocate or solicitor. The post is always held by a civilian rather than a commissioned officer, however an appointee may have previously been a member of the armed forces.  In practice the post is held by a senior circuit judge.

List of judge advocates general
Through 1847, the dates are those of actual entrance upon office, not of the appointment, which is usually a few days earlier; or of the patent, commonly some days later than those adopted in this list. After 1847 the dates are those of the London Gazette notices of the appointment.

January 1666: Samuel Barrowe
1684: George Clarke
1705: Thomas Byde
1715: Edward Hughes
1734: Sir Henry Hoghton
1741: Thomas Morgan
1768: Sir Charles Gould Morgan
8 March 1806: Nathaniel Bond
4 December 1807: Richard Ryder
8 November 1809: Charles Manners-Sutton
25 June 1817: Sir John Beckett
12 May 1827: James Abercromby
2 February 1828: Sir John Beckett
2 December 1830: Sir Robert Grant
7 July 1834: Robert Cutlar Fergusson
22 December 1834: Sir John Beckett
25 April 1835: Robert Cutlar Fergusson
6 November 1838: William St Julien Arabin
21 February 1839: Sir George Grey
26 June 1841: Richard Lalor Sheil
14 September 1841: John Iltyd Nicholl
31 January 1846: James Stuart Wortley
14 July 1846: Charles Buller
30 December 1847: William Goodenough Hayter
26 May 1849: Sir David Dundas
28 February 1852: George Bankes
30 December 1852: Charles Pelham Villiers
13 March 1858: John Mowbray
24 June 1859: Thomas Emerson Headlam
12 July 1866: John Mowbray
16 December 1868: Sir Colman Michael O'Loghlen
28 December 1870: John Robert Davison
17 May 1871: Sir Robert Joseph Phillimore (held office pending a rearrangement of its duties)
21 August 1873: Acton Smee Ayrton
7 March 1874: Stephen Cave
24 November 1875: George Cavendish-Bentinck
7 May 1880: George Osborne Morgan
13 July 1885: William Thackeray Marriott
22 February 1886: John William Mellor
9 August 1886: William Thackeray Marriott
13 December 1892: Sir Francis Jeune
31 August 1905: Thomas Milvain
7 October 1916: Sir Felix Cassel
21 September 1934: Colonel Sir Henry MacGeagh
1 January 1955: Captain Sir Frederick Gentle
1 January 1963: Wing Commander Sir Oliver Barnett
1 April 1968: Wing Commander Brian Duncan
1 August 1972: Harold Dean
1 August 1979: Major John Morgan-Owen
24 August 1984: James Stuart-Smith
1 February 1991: James Rant (died)
1 November 2004: Jeff Blackett
1 October 2020: Alan Macdonald Large

Includes material from: Haydn's Book of Dignities, 12th ed. (1894; reprinted 1969)

See also
 Judge-advocate
 Judge Advocate General
 Judge Advocate of the Fleet
 Judge Advocate General's Corps (United States)
 Judge Advocate General (Canada)

References

External links
 
 The Judge Advocate General (Ministry of Justice website)
 Military Jurisdiction - the Judge Advocate General (Judiciary website)
 Military Court Service (Ministry of Defence)

Military of the United Kingdom
Judiciaries of the United Kingdom
Judge Advocate General United K
United Kingdom military law
War Office
War Office in World War II
Courts-martial in the United Kingdom
United Kingdom